Cha Cha for Twins (Bao mi qia qia) is a 2012 Taiwanese romantic comedy film directed by Yang Yi-chien and Jim Wang.

The story involves a pair of identical twin sisters at age 17. Hormones have begun to kick in, and they are starting to have boy troubles. However, one of the boys that they date can't even tell them apart.

References

External links
 

Taiwanese romantic comedy films
2012 romantic comedy films
2012 films
Films set in Taipei
Films set in Kaohsiung
Films shot in Taiwan
2010s coming-of-age comedy films
Coming-of-age romance films
Films about twin sisters
2010s high school films
2010s teen comedy films
2010s teen romance films